Prem Kahani (English: "Love Story") is a 1937 Hindi film, by Franz Osten and starring Ashok Kumar, N.M. Joshi, Mayadevi, Vimala Devi, Madhurika Devi and others.

Plot
Two widowed neighbours thwart a love match when they try to arrange marriages for their respective children.

Cast

N.M.Joshi as Father
Bilqis as Mother
Aloka as Ratanbai, the daughter
M.Nazir as Chandrakanta
Kamta Prasad as Priest
Tarabai Solanki as Heera
Saroj Borkar as Shanti
Maya Devi as Maya
Ashok Kumar as Jagat
P.F.Pithawala as Bhagwandas
Vimala Devi as Ramla
Chandraprabha as Ms. Prabha
Manohar Ghatwai as Motilal
Sunita Devi as Ms. Indira
Mumtaz Ali as Mr. Sharma
Madhurika Devi	as Usha
Ahteramuddin

Production
Bombay Talkies produced two films in 1937, Jeevan Prabhat and Prem Kahani. This is also Bombay Talkies' eighth film since the studio was founded in 1934.

Khorshed Minocher-Homji aka Saraswati Devi, one of the few female composers of Hindi cinema, composed music for this film.

Writer Niranjan Pal's original title for the English-language story and screenplay was 'Touchstone' or 'Marriage Market', indicating a shorthand version of the film's theme. The verse that Pal uses as a mood reference for one of the songs in the film is from Arthur Ryder's 1912 translation of Kalidasa’s Kumarasambhava or The Birth of the War-God.

References

External links

 
 Watch Prem Kahani film entirely annotated with archival material at Indiancine.ma

1937 films
1930s Hindi-language films
Articles containing video clips
Indian black-and-white films
Indian romantic drama films
1937 romantic drama films